Ponnu Matriculation Higher Secondary School, is located in Dharapuram, Tamil Nadu, India and run by the Ramakrishna Madam Trust, Dharapuram. This is the first matriculation school in Dharapuram area and provides kindergarten, elementary to higher secondary school education

History
The school was started as an English medium school in the town of Dharapuram providing schooling up to Tenth grade Matriculation by Thangavelu Mudaliar. Later the school was upgraded to Higher Secondary. The school now has a play ground, and an examination center for Matriculation and Tamil Nadu HSC examinations. It has hostels for students who have come from afar.
 
The founder was Thangavel Mudaliar. The school is run by the Sri Ramakrishna Madam charitable trust, Dharapuram

Uniform
 5th Std. for boys: clear and plain white shirt, maroon short trousers.
 5th Std. to 10th Std. for boys: clear and plain white shirt, maroon full trousers.
 5th Std. for girls: clear and plain white shirt, maroon skirts.
 5th Std. to 10th Std. for girls: plain white shirt and maroon gowns.

Higher secondary for boys 
 Mondays: Clear and plain white shirt and full trousers.
 Weekdays: Maroon and white checked shirts, maroon full trousers.

Higher secondary for girls
 Mondays: Clear white plain shirt and skirt.
 Weekdays: Maroon and white checked shirts, maroon skirts.

All the students wear a maroon tie, which the school provides. The badges for the tie is a flat bronze badge with the school logo and motto in it.

Students wear black shoes with maroon socks. For higher secondary students, Mondays black shoes with white socks.

Saturday is a half working day for the students, where students can wear non-uniforms on Saturday and the school runs up to 1:00 pm on Saturdays.

Education
The school has produced district toppers in matriculation as well as higher secondary exams. It has a record of maintaining highest pass percentage in the area, almost cent percent every year.

Sports
Though sport is not main agenda, the school has a playground with physical education trainer. Athletics, volleyball, kabaddi, and kho-kho teams participate in district level and zonal level sports meets.

Gallery

References

Ponnu Matriculation Higher Secondary School

Primary schools in Tamil Nadu
High schools and secondary schools in Tamil Nadu
Tiruppur district
Educational institutions established in 1984
1984 establishments in Tamil Nadu